Vermipardus is a genus of wormlion in the family Vermileonidae.

Species
Vermipardus barracloughi Stuckenberg, 1997
Vermipardus basuto (Stuckenberg, 1961)
Vermipardus brevirostris (Bezzi, 1926)
Vermipardus brincki (Stuckenberg, 1961)
Vermipardus intermedius (Stuckenberg, 1961)
Vermipardus londti Stuckenberg, 1995
Vermipardus munroi Stuckenberg, 1995
Vermipardus promontorii (Stuckenberg, 1961)
Vermipardus sathon Stuckenberg, 1995
Vermipardus sylphe Stuckenberg, 1995
Vermipardus trisignatus Stuckenberg, 1997
Vermipardus univittatus (Stuckenberg, 1961)
Vermipardus whiteheadi Stuckenberg, 1997

References

Diptera of Africa
Brachycera genera
Taxa named by Brian Roy Stuckenberg
Vermileonomorpha